Christian Köberl  (born February 18, 1959 in Vienna) is a professor of impact research and planetary geology at the University of Vienna, Austria. From June 2010 to May 2020 he was director general of the Natural History Museum in Vienna. He is best known for his research on meteorite impact craters.

Biography and career
Born in Vienna, Austria, in 1959, Köberl attended a technical high school specializing in chemistry, and from 1978 studied chemistry and physics at the Technical University of Vienna, as well as astronomy at the University of Vienna. In 1983, he completed his PhD studies at the University of Graz, Austria, with a dissertation in cosmochemistry. In 1985 he joined the faculty of the newly founded Institute of Geochemistry at the University of Vienna, becoming an assistant professor. In 1988, he joined the Lunar and Planetary Institute (Houston, TX, USA) and the NASA Johnson Space Center for half a year as a Fulbright Scholar. This was followed by several more research appointments at these institutions. In 1990, he obtained the "Habilitation" in Geo- and Cosmochemistry at the University of Vienna and was awarded tenure as associate professor.

From 1992–1995, Koeberl spent several months of each year at the isotope geochemistry laboratories of the Department of Terrestrial Magnetism at the Carnegie Institution in Washington, DC, USA, to work on osmium isotope geochemistry. In 1993, he was a visiting professor at the  University of the Witwatersrand, Johannesburg, South Africa, and, in 1994, a visiting professor at the Department of Earth Sciences, Dartmouth College, New Hampshire, USA, where he remained an adjunct professor from 1994 to 2000.

In 2004, Koeberl was elected corresponding member, and in 2006 full member of the Austrian Academy of Sciences. In 2006, an asteroid was named after Köberl. In 2007, he received the Barringer Medal of the Meteoritical Society, its highest award for research related to impact cratering studies. From 2007 to 2010, Köberl served as Visiting Research Professor at the Department of Earth Sciences and the Planetary and Space Science Research Institute,  Open University, Milton Keynes, United Kingdom. From 2008 until 2010, he was head of the Department of Lithospheric Research, one of the earth science departments at the University of Vienna.

From March 2009,Koeberl was appointed full professor of impact research and planetary geology at the University of Vienna. In December 2009, he was appointed director general of Vienna's Natural History Museum, a post that he took up in June 2010. In addition to remaining on the faculty of the University of Vienna, he is also a member of the board of the Austrian Science Fund, and is editor of the Bulletin of the Geological Society of America and co-editor of the journals Geochimica et Cosmochimica Acta and Meteoritics & Planetary Science.

Research
Köberl's research activities center around two main themes: the investigation of impact cratering related processes and rocks through detailed and multidisciplinary investigations (mainly using geochemistry, petrography, and mineralogy, but also field geology and geophysics), as well as the development and testing of new methods that can be applied for such studies. He has made contributions to our knowledge of a large number of impact structures, particularly in terms of impact geochemistry, and has in some cases contributed to the discovery of previously unknown impact craters.

His other major research topic involves the determination of extraterrestrial components in impact-related rocks. In addition, Köberl has spent decades in studying tektites, and his work was important in reaching the conclusion that these are a rare form of terrestrial glasses that form in the earliest phases of crater formation. He has been the principal investigator of several International Continental Scientific Drilling Program (ICDP) drilling projects: at the Bosumtwi impact crater in Ghana in 2004, the Chesapeake Bay crater drilling project in the USA in 2005/6, the El'gygytgyn crater project in the Russian Arctic in 2009, and the planned Songliao Basin drilling project in China.

Additional research interests include investigations of terrestrial mass extinction horizons (including the late Eocene, K-Pg, Tr-J, and P-Tr strata), of meteorites and lunar rocks, Antarctic meteorite field studies, snowball earth, and several other geochemistry-related issues. He participated in or led numerous field expeditions, including Antarctica in 1986/7 and desert regions in Namibia, South Africa, Egypt, Libya, Mauritania, and Mongolia, and to numerous impact craters around the world. He participated in several documentary movies on impact related topics. From 1998 to 2003 he was chair and coordinator of the European Science Foundation "Impact" program. He is also on the science team of the Midas experiment on board the Rosetta comet probe.

Köberl has written or edited 15 books and is the author of over 450 peer-reviewed research publications. He has organized several international research conferences, including the Annual Meeting of the Meteoritical Society in 1989 in Vienna, Austria; the meeting on Catastrophic Events & Mass Extinctions: Impacts and Beyond, in 2000 in Vienna, Austria; Geological Society of America Field Forum on "Bolide Impacts on Wet Targets" in Nevada and Utah, USA; and the Geological Society of America Penrose Conference on "Hothouse, Icehouse, and Impacts: The Late Eocene Earth" at Monte Conero in Italy. 
In his capacity as director general of the Natural History Museum in Vienna, Köberl is planning to increase the quality and visibility of research at the museum, to provide a larger number and greater variation of special exhibitions covering modern natural sciences, and to renovate and update the permanent exhibitions.

Honors and awards
 1987 – Antarctica Service Medal of the United States of America
 1988 – Fulbright Visiting Scholar, USA.
 1994 – Fellow of the Meteoritical Society
 1995 – Meritorious Service Award, Geochimica et Cosmochimica Acta
 1996 – Start-Preis of the Federal Ministry of Science, Austria
 1997 – Novartis Award for Chemistry
 2000 – Fellow of the Geological Society of South Africa
 2004 – elected Corresponding Member of the Austrian Academy of Sciences
 2006 – elected Full Member of the Austrian Academy of Sciences
 2006 – Asteroid (15963) named "Koeberl"
 2007 – Barringer Medal of the Meteoritical Society
 2021 – Meteoritical Society's Service Award

Further reading
 Montanari, A., and Koeberl, C. (2000) Impact Stratigraphy: The Italian Record. Lecture Notes in Earth Sciences, Vol. 93, Springer Verlag, Heidelberg, 364 pp.
 Koeberl, C., and MacLeod, K., Eds. (2002) Catastrophic Events and Mass Extinctions: Impacts and Beyond. Geological Society of America, Special Paper 356, 746 pp.
 Koeberl, C., and Henkel, H., Eds. (2005) Impact Tectonics. Impact Studies, vol. 6, Springer, Heidelberg, 552 + XIX pp.
 Cockell, C.S., Koeberl, C., and Gilmour, I. (eds.) (2006) Biological Processes Associated with Impact Events. Impact Studies, vol. 8, Springer, Heidelberg, 376 +XVI pp..
 Harms, U., Koeberl, C., and Zoback, M.D. (eds.) (2007) Continental Scientific Drilling. Springer, Heidelberg, 366 + X pp..
 Koeberl, C., and Montanari, A. (eds.) (2009) The Late Eocene Earth: Hothouse, icehouse, and Impacts. Geological Society of America, Special Paper No. 452, 322 + viii pp.

References and external links

 CV University of Vienna
 Natural History Museum in Vienna
 Austrian Academy of Sciences (English)
 JPL Small-Body Database Browser
 Meteoritics & Planetary Science 42, Nr 8, Supplement, A7–A9 (2007) (PDF)
 Austrian Science Fund Board
 The Geological Society of America
 ICDP – Lake Bosumtwi Drilling Project
 IODP – Lake Bosumtwi Drilling Project  (PDF)
 CCGM – Lake Bosumtwi Drilling Project
   Chesapeake Bay Impact Structure Deep Drilling Project
 Earth Magazine – Lake El'gygytgyn Drilling Project
 Lake El'gygytgyn Drilling Project
 Terrestrial Scientific Drilling Project of the Cretaceous Songliao Basin
 Terrestrial Scientific Drilling Project of the Cretaceous Songliao Basin
 TV6 – The Fireball of Tutankhamun
 Response of the Earth System to Impact Processes (IMPACT)
 Meteoritical Society Meetings
 Penrose Conference Report (PDF)

1959 births
Living people
Austrian geochemists
Academic staff of the University of Vienna
Barringer Medal winners